Fernando Uribe Hincapié (born 1 January 1988) is a Colombian footballer who plays as a striker.

Club career

Early career
Born in Pereira, Uribe was an Atlético Huila youth graduate. On 24 April 2003, he scored his first professional goal by netting the opener in a 2–2 Categoría Primera A away draw against Cortuluá; aged just 15 years, 3 months and 23 days, he became the youngest player ever to score a goal in Colombian professional football.

Regularly used during his debut season, Uribe failed to appear in the following two campaigns, and moved to Categoría Primera B side Girardot in December 2005. After two years being sparingly used, he subsequently moved to fellow second division club Cortuluá; his only goal for the latter club came on 25 August 2008, when he scored the only goal of a home defeat of Unión Magdalena.

Uribe returned to the top tier in 2009, playing with Deportivo Pereira. After spending the first half of the campaign without scoring, he netted eight times during the Clausura tournament, helping his side reach the semifinals; highlights included a hat-trick in a 4–1 home routing of Once Caldas on 13 September.

Once Caldas
In January 2010, Uribe joined Once Caldas after impressing with Pereira. On his debut for the club on 31 January, he scored a hat-trick in a 4–3 away loss against Real Cartagena.

Uribe scored a career-best 24 league goals during the year, also scoring three times in a 5–3 loss at Deportivo Cali and in a 3–1 home defeat of América de Cali.

Chievo
On 20 January 2011, Uribe moved abroad for the first time in his career, agreeing to a four-year contract with Serie A club ChievoVerona. He made his debut abroad on 6 March, coming on as a late substitute for Davide Mandelli in a 0–0 home draw against Parma.

Uribe scored his first goal abroad on 9 May 2011, netting the opener in a 2–2 away draw against Juventus. He also scored a brace in a 3–0 success over Modena.

Atlético Nacional
On 23 July 2012, Uribe returned to his homeland and signed a four-year deal with Atlético Nacional. He scored in only his second match for the club, a 1–1 home draw against Rionegro on 6 August, and scored a brace in a 2–0 home success over against La Equidad on 9 December.

Millonarios (loan)
On 27 June 2014, Uribe was presented at Millonarios, on loan for one year with a buyout clause. On 28 September, he scored four times in a 4–0 home routing of Fortaleza FC.

On 17 May 2015, Uribe scored the equalizer in a 3–1 win against Independiente Santa Fe, helping his team qualify to the tournament's semifinals. Four days later, in the first leg of the quarterfinals, he scored a hat-trick in a 4–0 win over Envigado, as his side advanced with a 6–3 aggregate score. In the semifinals, he scored a brace in a 3–2 away defeat of Deportivo Cali, but his side was knocked out in the shoot-outs.

Toluca
On 23 June 2015, Liga MX team Toluca officially announced Uribe as their new striker, in a three-year contract. He made his debut on 25 July, in a 1–0 away win against Tigres UANL.

On 29 July 2015, Uribe scored his first hat-trick in the first game of the Copa MX, a 4–2 win against Necaxa. On 13 September, Uribe scored four goals in a 4–3 success over Pachuca.

Flamengo
On 26 June 2018 Uribe signed a four-year contract with Série A club Flamengo. He made his debut for the club on 19 July, replacing Marlos Moreno on the 62nd minute of a 1-0 loss to São Paulo at the Maracanã Stadium.

On 29 July 2018, Uribe scored his first goal for the club, in a 4–1 routing of Sport Recife also at the Maracanã. In the following campaign, however, he lost space after the arrivals of Gabriel and Bruno Henrique.

Santos
On 30 May 2019, Uribe moved to fellow top tier club Santos, signing a contract until December 2022. He made his debut for the club three days later, starting in a 1–0 away defeat of Ceará.

On 18 September 2020, after 16 goalless appearances, Uribe left Santos after being released from his contract by the Brazilian Football Confederation; the entity, however, denied the appeal for just cause, and also allowed Santos to ask for a compensation fee if Uribe signs for another club.

Millonarios 
On 18 January 2021, Uribe signed with Colombian side Millonarios F.C.

International career
Uribe made his full international debut for Colombia on 11 August 2010, replacing Carlos Bacca in a 1–1 draw against Bolivia in La Paz.

Career statistics

Club

International

Honours
Once Caldas
Categoría Primera A: 2010-II

Atlético Nacional
Copa Colombia: 2012
Superliga Colombiana: 2012

Flamengo
Campeonato Carioca: 2019

References

External links
 
 

1988 births
Living people
People from Pereira, Colombia
Colombian footballers
Association football forwards
Categoría Primera A players
Categoría Primera B players
Atlético Huila footballers
Girardot F.C. footballers
Cortuluá footballers
Deportivo Pereira footballers
Once Caldas footballers
Atlético Nacional footballers
Millonarios F.C. players
Serie A players
A.C. ChievoVerona players
Liga MX players
Deportivo Toluca F.C. players
Campeonato Brasileiro Série A players
CR Flamengo footballers
Santos FC players
Colombia international footballers
Colombian expatriate footballers
Colombian expatriates in Italy
Colombian expatriates in Mexico
Colombian expatriate sportspeople in Brazil
Expatriate footballers in Italy
Expatriate footballers in Mexico
Expatriate footballers in Brazil